Buffy the Vampire Slayer: Food Chain is a trade paperback collecting comic stories based on the Buffy the Vampire Slayer television series. Food Chain was the largest Buffy graphic novel to come out before the Buffy: Omnibus volumes.

Story description

General synopsis

Food Chain contains a collection of several Buffy stories that take place across three years.

Food Chain (Part 1)

Originally appeared in Buffy the Vampire Slayer #12 (under the title "A Nice Girl Like You").

A new girl has arrived in Sunnydale. She seems to the school to be a sweet and intelligent high-school senior. However, strangely, she decides to spend time with delinquents. Buffy believes there is something odd about her.

Food Chain (Part 2)

Originally appeared in Buffy the Vampire Slayer #16 (under the title "Food Chain").

Buffy Summers hopes to relax with her friends, but a demonic force strikes Sunnydale and leads to a number of deaths. Even though she disliked those who have died, she must get to the bottom of the mystery.

Double Cross

Originally appeared in Buffy the Vampire Slayer #20.

Set directly after Graduation Day, Part Two when Angel had left for L.A., and Buffy was preparing for life without him in Sunnydale. Demonic forces had hoped to exploit the separation of these two powerful enemies, but Buffy and Angel are closer than such forces could imagine.

Bad Dog

Originally appeared in Buffy the Vampire Slayer Annual 1999.

It's that time of the month for Oz, but the wolf escapes from the library. Buffy eventually tracks down werewolf-Oz, then uses him to track Willow. Willow has been kidnapped by Alan Duffy, a normal kid with a desperate taste for the supernatural.

The Latest Craze

Originally appeared in Buffy the Vampire Slayer Annual 1999.

What happens when owning miniature demons becomes a fad for the rich and snooty.

Punish Me With Kisses

Originally appeared in Buffy the Vampire Slayer: Lovers' Walk.

Willow and Tara, on their way to find a powerful flower, meet a ghostly couple and help them to resolve their differences.

One Small Promise

Originally appeared in Buffy the Vampire Slayer: Lovers' Walk.

Buffy gives Riley a present, Riley is surprised by the offer of jewelry, then the two dispose of a group of vampires.

City of Despair

Originally appeared in Buffy/Angel #½ (published jointly by Dark Horse and Wizard).

Buffy and Angel confront each other in another dimension, and seemingly battle against each other.

Continuity

Supposed to be set in Buffy the Vampire Slayer'''s third and fourth seasons.

Canonical issues

Buffy comics such as this one are not usually considered by fans as canonical. Some fans consider them stories from the imaginations of authors and artists, while other fans consider them as taking place in an alternative fictional reality. However unlike fan fiction, overviews summarising their story, written early in the writing process, were 'approved' by both Fox and Joss Whedon (or his office), and the books were therefore later published as officially Buffy merchandise.

However, two of the stories in the Food Chain collection – "Bad Dog" and "Double Cross" – were written by Buffy television writer Doug Petrie.

In City of Despair, the character Hellboy makes a background appearance as one of the captured demons. Hellboy also made a cameo in Past Lives'' as a bust in Giles' office.

Notes

External links
BBC - Cult - Buffy the Vampire Slayer Ecomics Many of the above comics are available for free as ecomics from the BBC website.

Comics based on Buffy the Vampire Slayer